Walther Gottlieb Aeschbacher (2 October 1901 – 6 December 1969) was a Swiss conductor and composer of classical music.

References

1901 births
1969 deaths
Swiss male composers
Swiss conductors (music)
Male conductors (music)
People from Bern
20th-century conductors (music)
20th-century male musicians
20th-century Swiss composers